James Bradley McLeod (April 8, 1937 – May 18, 2019) was a Canadian ice hockey goaltender.

McLeod started his National Hockey League career with the St. Louis Blues in 1972. He would also play in the World Hockey Association with the Chicago Cougars, Los Angeles Sharks, Michigan Stags, and New York Golden Blades. He retired after the 1975 season. He died in 2019.

References

External links

1937 births
2019 deaths
Baltimore Blades players
Canadian ice hockey goaltenders
Chicago Cougars players
Greensboro Generals (SHL) players
Ice hockey people from Ontario
Los Angeles Sharks players
Michigan Stags players
Jersey Knights players
New York Golden Blades players
Portland Buckaroos players
St. Louis Blues players
Seattle Totems (WHL) players
Sportspeople from Thunder Bay
Muskegon Zephyrs players